Young Concert Artists is a New York City-based non-profit organization dedicated to discovering and promoting the careers of talented young classical musicians from all over the world. The competition, founded in 1961, allows artists from all over the world to compete as individuals or in a chamber group, such as a string quartet. The number of winners varies from year to year, as there is no specified limit to the number of participants who can win.

Winners of the competition receive a cash prize and are provided the opportunity to perform in concert at Carnegie Hall in New York City and the Kennedy Center in Washington D.C. Winners are also provided with an artistic manager who promotes the artist through booking concert engagements both in the United States and abroad, and providing publicity materials, promotion, and career development. Many artists in the program's history have also made their debut recordings through the help of the Young Concert Artists program.

Notable past winners include violinists Pinchas Zukerman, Ani Kavafian, Ida Kavafian, and Chee-Yun; pianists Murray Perahia, Emanuel Ax, Richard Goode, Jean-Yves Thibaudet, Christopher O'Riley, Ruth Laredo and Olli Mustonen; flutists Paula Robison, Mimi Stillman, and Eugenia Zukerman; the Tokyo, St. Lawrence, and Borromeo String Quartets; violist Antoine Tamestit; cellists Ronald Thomas, Fred Sherry and Carter Brey; trumpeter Stephen Burns; and sopranos Marvis Martin and Dawn Upshaw.

Conductor James Levine was awarded the Lotus Award ("for inspiration to young musicians") from Young Concert Artists.

List of winners
Young Concert Artists refers to its winners as alumni:

1960s

1961
Sanford Allen, violinist
Shmuel Ashkenasi, violinist
Ruth Glasser, cellist
Richard Goode, pianist
Jesse Levine, violist
Maria Lopez-Vito, pianist
Barbara Mallow, cellist
Paula Robison, flutist
Joel Shapiro, pianist
Ilana Vered, pianist

1962

Kenneth Goldsmith, violinist
Ruth Laredo, pianist
Robert Martin, cellist
Margaret Schecter, flutist
Lawrence L. Smith, pianist
Inger Wikström, pianist

1963

Chandler Goetting, trumpeter
Luis García Renart, cellist
Yoko Matsuda, violinist
Satoka Takemae, pianist

1964

Edward Auer, pianist
Mauricio Fuks, violinist
Jung-Ja Kim, pianist
Mary Beth Peil, soprano
Toby Saks, cellist

1965

Paul Green, clarinetist
Ko Iwasaki, cellist
Max Neuhaus, percussionist
Michael Oelbaum, pianist
Murray Perahia, pianist
Lorraine Prieur, pianist
Paul Zukofsky, violinist

1966

Nerine Barrett, pianist
Christiane Edinger, violinist
Donald Weilerstein, violinist
Pinchas Zukerman, violinist

1967

Joan Benner, soprano
Nobuko Imai, violist
Joseph Kalichstein, pianist
Arthur Thompson, baritone
Marcus Thompson, violist
Hiroko Yajima, violinist

1968

Jean-Jacques Kantorow, violinist
Joyce Mathis, soprano
Anthony Newman, harpsichordist
Ursula Oppens, pianist
Fred Sherry, cellist
Michael Webster, clarinetist

1969

Gita Karasik, pianist
Jeffrey Solow, cellist

1970s

1970

Mari-Elizabeth Morgen, pianist
Eugenia Zukerman, flutist
Tokyo String Quartet

1971

Joy Blackett, mezzo-soprano
Christoph Henkel, cellist
Rolf Schulte, violinist
Virgil Blackwell, clarinetist
Eugene Drucker, violinist
Paul Dunkel, flutist
Richard Fitz, percussionist
John Graham, violist
Karen Lindquist, harpist
Joel Marangella, oboist
Donald Palma, double bass
Gerard Schwarz, trumpeter
Fred Sherry, cellist

1972

Mona Golabek, pianist
Francoise Regnat, pianist
Peter Rejto, cellist

1973

Emanuel Ax, pianist
Ani Kavafian, violinist
Diane Walsh, pianist

1974

Heiichiro Ohyama, violist
Robert Routch, French horn
Jeffrey Swann, pianist
Ronald Thomas, cellist

1975

 (none)

1976

Daniel Adni, pianist
Boris Bloch, pianist
Stephanie Brown, pianist
Sung-Ju Lee, violinist
Daniel Phillips, violinist
Chilingirian String Quartet

1977

Steven De Groote, pianist

1978

Colin Carr, cellist
Lynn Chang, violinist
Robert Cohen, cellist
Ida Kavafian, violinist

1979

Franck Avril, oboist
Sergei Edelmann, pianist
Zehava Gal, mezzo-soprano
Beverly Hoch, soprano
Marya Martin, flutist

1980s

1980

Toby Appel, violist
Chantal Juillet, violinist

1981

Stephen Burns, trumpeter
Marvis Martin, soprano
Christopher O'Riley, pianist
Jean-Yves Thibaudet, pianist
Endellion Quartet
Mendelssohn String Quartet

1982

Carter Brey, cellist
William Sharp, baritone
Dominique Weber, pianist

1983

Jaime Bolipata, pianist
Ben Holt, baritone
Benny Kim, violinist
Anne-Marie McDermott, pianist
Jeremy Menuhin, pianist
Christopher Trakas, baritone

1984

Douglas Boyd, oboist
Daniel McKelway, clarinetist
Paul Meyer, clarinetist
Dawn Upshaw, soprano

1985

Erik Berchot, pianist
Marc Laforet, pianist
Gary Schocker, flutist

1986

Jean-Efflam Bavouzet, pianist
Christopher Costanza, cellist
Anthony De Mare, pianist
Yuval Fichman, pianist
Anne Akiko Meyers, violinist
Marcy Rosen, cellist
Eric Ruske, French horn
Paul Shaw, pianist
Ory Shihor, pianist
Maurice Sklar, violinist

1987

Hung-Kuan Chen, pianist
Rina Dokshitsky, pianist
Olli Mustonen, pianist

1988

David Fedele, flutist
Eduardus Halim, pianist
Carl Halvorson, tenor
Hexagon Ensemble, piano and winds
Ulrike Anima Mathe, violinist
Asako Urushihara, violinist

1989

Dmitri Berlinsky, violinist
Olivier Charlier, violinist
Chee-Yun, violinist
Juliette Kang, violinist
Scott St. John, violinist & violist
Scott Yoo, violinist

1990s

1990

Dawn Kotoski, soprano
Todd Palmer, clarinetist
Alex Slobodyanik, pianist

1991

Borromeo String Quartet
Emma Johnson, clarinetist
Graham Scott, pianist
Mikhail Yanovitsky, pianist

1992

Christopheren Nomura, baritone
Kyoko Saito, soprano
St. Lawrence Quartet

1993

Camellia Johnson, soprano

1994

Dan Coleman, composer-in-residence
Alban Gerhardt, cellist
Jan-Erik Gustafsson, cellist
Makoto Nakura, marimbist
Nokuthula Ngwenyama, violist

1995

Diana Doherty, oboist
Fazıl Say, pianist

1996

Romain Guyot, clarinetist
Freddy Kempf, pianist
Adam Neiman, pianist
Joo-Young Oh, violinist
Kevin Puts, composer-in-residence
Yayoi Toda, violinist
Gregory Turay, tenor

1997

Anton Barachovsky, violinist
Alexander Chaushian, cellist
Wendy Chen, pianist
Jeremy Denk, pianist
Karen Gomyo, violinist
Stefan Milenkovich, violinist
Shunsuke Sato, violinist

1998

Kenji Bunch, composer-in-residence
Stephan Loges, baritone
Alexander Mikhailuk, pianist
Naoko Shimizu, violist
Vassilis Varvaresos, pianist

1999

Timothy Fain, violinist
Martin Kasik, pianist
Rafal Kwiatkowski, cellist
Randall Scarlata, baritone
Mimi Stillman, flutist
Elina Vähälä, violinist
Gwyneth Wentink, harpist

2000s

2000

Ju-Young Baek, violinist
Mason Bates, composer
Catrin Finch, harpist
Viviane Hagner, violinist
Paavali Jumppanen, pianist
Mayuko Kamio, violinist

2001

Alexandre Bouzlov, cellist
Marius Brenciu, tenor
Courtenay Budd, soprano
Thomas Cerroll, cellist
Yunjie Chen, pianist
Claremont Piano Trio
Alezander Fiterstein, clarinetist

2002

Robert Belinic, guitarist
Anton Belov, baritone
Daniel Kellogg, composer
Nicolas Kendall, violinist
Vassily Primakov, pianist
Naoko Takada, marimbist

2003

Laura Buruiana, cellist
David Guerrier, trumpeter
Antoine Tamestit, violist
Daxun Zhang, double bassist

2004

Lise de la Salle, pianist
Jose Franch-Ballester, clarinetist
Alexandre Pirojenko, pianist

2005

Efe Baltacigil, cellist
Benjamin C. S. Boyle, composer
Philippe Castagner, tenor
Jennifer Check, soprano
Gleb Ivanov, pianist
Jupiter String Quartet
Dora Seres, flutist
Wonny Song, pianist

2006

Emmanuel Ceysson, harpist
Chu-Fang Huang, pianist
Amedeo Modigliani Quartet
Jean-Frédéric Neuburger, pianist

2007

Sasha Cooke, mezzo-soprano
Benjamin Moser, pianist
Andrew Norman, composer
Louis Schwizgebel, pianist

2008

Pius Cheung, marimbist
Narek Hakhnazaryan, cellist

2008/2009

Ray Chen, violinist
Ran Dank, pianist
Jeanine De Bique, soprano
Hanbin Yoo (Amadéus Leopold), violinist
Bella Hristova, violinist
Noé Inui, violinist
Carolina Ullrich, soprano

2009

Charlie Albright, pianist
Caroline Goulding, violinist
Aleksandr Haskin, flutist
Jennifer Johnson Cano, mezzo-soprano

2010s

2010

Narek Arutyunian, clarinetist
Benjamin Beilman, violinist
George Li, pianist
Chris Rogerson, composer

2011

Veit Hertenstein, violist
Paul Huang, violinist
Andrew Tyson, pianist

2012

Julia Bullock, soprano
Hermès Quartet
David Hertzberg, composer
Ji-Yong Kim, pianist
Cicely Parnas, cellist
Aleksey Semenenko, violinist

2013

Raphaël Sévère, clarinetist
Stephen Waarts, violinist
Yun-Chin Zhou, pianist

2014

Daniel Lebhardt, pianist
Sang-Eun Lee, cellist
Soo-Been Lee, violinist
Edgar Moreau, cellist
Ziyu Shen, violist
Seiya Ueno, flutist

2015

Rémi Geniet, pianist
Tomer Gewirtzman, pianist
Samuel Hasselhorn, baritone
Dasol Kim, pianist
Tonia Ko, composer
Olivier Stankiewicz, oboist
Zorá String Quartet

2016

Benjamin Baker, violinist
Xavier Foley, double bassist
Nathan Lee, pianist
Anthony Trionfo, flutist

2017

Katherine Balch, composer
Zlatomir Fung, cellist
Do-Hyun Kim, pianist
Omer Quartet
Hanzhi Wang, accordionist

2018

Randall Goosby, violinist
Risa Hokamura, violinist
Maxim Lando, pianist
Aristo Sham, pianist
Jonathan Swensen, cellist

2019
Steven Banks, saxophonist
Martin James Bartlett, pianist
Albert Cano Smit, pianist
Saad Haddad, composer
Quartet Amabile

2020s

2020
Megan Moore, mezzo-soprano
Zhu Wang, pianist
William Socolof, bass-baritone

2021
Nina Shekhar, composer-in-residence

References

External links

Music organizations based in the United States
Arts organizations established in 1961
Culture of New York City
Classical music awards
Piano competitions in the United States
1961 establishments in New York City